The Tecnam P2012 Traveller is an eleven-seat utility aircraft designed and manufactured by the Italian company Costruzioni Aeronautiche Tecnam, based in Capua, Italy, near Naples.

In 2009, Cape Air, a commuter airline based in Massachusetts, asked Tecnam for a new aircraft meeting their needs.
The project was publicly revealed in April 2011.
In November 2015, Cape Air signed a letter of intent to order 100 aircraft.
On 21 July 2016, the first prototype performed its maiden flight.
In October 2018, testing had been completed, and type certification from European Aviation Safety Agency was received during December 2018.
The first customer delivery occurred during March 2019.
American Federal Aviation Administration certification was awarded in August 2019, and Cape Air received its first two aircraft via transatlantic ferry flight in October 2019.

It is Tecnam's first commercial aircraft and after its introduction as a commuter airliner, it could be used for VIP, cargo, parachuting and medevac.
The company can produce up to 40 aircraft per year.
Tecnam forecasts a demand for 11,500 short-haul commuter aircraft between 2018 and 2028.

Development 

In 2009, Cape Air, a Massachusetts-based commuter airline operating in the Caribbean and New England, was looking for a successor for its fleet of 83 Cessna 402s.
After being rebuffed by aircraft manufacturers Cessna and Piper, Cape Air approached Italian manufacturer Tecnam, specialised in trainers and private aircraft but interested in a commercial aircraft.
The P2012 is Tecnam's most complex and important programme, "the first time we've developed an aircraft from the operator's point of view".

In April 2011, the P2012 project was publicly unveiled at AERO Friedrichshafen by Tecnam and Cape Air.

Funding came from private sources and the Italian government.

On 1 April 2016, the first completed prototype was rolled out.
It conducted its maiden flight on 21 July 2016.

By April 2017, the first prototype was flown more than 100 hours while the second was set to join during September, targeting a December 2018 certification.
The nearly production standard second prototype seats up to nine passengers and conducted its first flight on 22 December 2017; by then the first prototype had flown more than 250 hours.

By August 2018, certification was on track for the year end with 400 hours flown, while the backlog attained 130 and three aircraft were in production.
In October 2018, testing was completed after 500 flight hours between the two prototypes.
After 600 hours flown by the two prototypes, European type certification was awarded on 20 December 2018, including in icing conditions; approval from the US authority was expected to follow shortly.

The first example was handed over in March 2019.
In July, Boeing was selected as the sole provider of aftermarket spare parts and distribution services through its Aviall distribution network.
By then, Cape Air accepted the first two P2012, the last milestone before final delivery, after having reviewed their manuals, inspected and flight tested them.
The FAA granted its type approval on 11 July, while Cape Air awaits airworthiness certifications for each individual aircraft.
On 16 October, 30 years after Cape Air's first flight, the company unveiled its first two aircraft, intending to deploy them in early December on revenue flights.
Zil Air in Mahe, Seychelles, received its first P2012 on 29 November 2019.

On 22 February 2020, Cape Air started revenue service from Hyannis, Massachusetts, to Nantucket Island, before Hyannis-Boston and Boston-Nantucket with five P2012s, while four were being ferried in late February.
The carrier evaluates their performance in New England before operating it from Marion, Illinois, to Nashville and St Louis from 4 March, then maybe deploying it in Billings, Montana.
The carrier expects to have 20 in the fleet by the end of 2020.

Market 

At the April 2011 unveiling, Tecnam planned VIP, cargo, parachuting and medevac variants after the commuter airliner introduction in 2015.

In November 2015, Cape Air signed a letter of intent to order 100 aircraft while three prototypes were being built at Tecnam's plant in Capua, Italy.

Tecnam aimed for 25 to 35 deliveries in 2019 and more in following years.
Six new customers from Argentina, the South Pacific region and Russia had placed orders at the April 2017 AERO Friedrichshafen.
Tecnam extended its Capua factory for a P2012 production area, capable of producing up to 40 aircraft per year.
The delivery schedule for the first 20 aircraft to Cape Air was firmed on 21 September 2017: these first deliveries are due in January 2019 after EASA and FAA certification.

Tecnam takes a €100,000 ($118,200) deposit to secure a 2019 delivery position and 20 aircraft per year should be delivered between 2019 and 2023.
A second factory could be established to further expand production.
Service entry during early 2019 should see 20 deliveries, including 8 to Cape Air, two for Seychelles-based Zil Air from July, and the others for charter and utility operators.
Cape Air should allocate its first eight aircraft to serve New England from its Hyannis, Massachusetts, headquarters: Cape Cod, Nantucket, Martha’s Vineyard, Vermont and Maine, as a FAR part 135 operator while training first officers.
By October 2018, Tecnam had secured 125 orders and options for the €2.35 million ($2.7 million) Traveller, forecasting a demand for 11,500 commuter aircraft over the following ten years.

Tecnam planned to build 15 units during 2019; increasing to 25 aircraft in 2020 and to 35 during 2021.
Cape Air should acquire eight Travellers in 2019 and 12 in 2020, and have 92 more options during the next 10 years.

Design 

The Traveller is a twin piston-engined aircraft, powered by a pair of Lycoming TEO540C1As, each capable of providing up to 375hp (280kW), which give the type a maximum cruise speed of 190kn (351km/h).
The design complies with FAR Part 23 and EASA CS-23 regulations.

Its range of 950nmi (1,750km) and its large passenger door make it suitable for commuter, air taxi, medevac, troop transport and air cargo roles.
The P2012 aims to replace the Cessna 402 and Britten-Norman BN-2 Islander, to compete with modern single-engine aircraft like the Quest Kodiak and could complement the larger DHC-6 Twin Otter.
Cape Air required single-pilot operations, a modern cockpit, an unpressurised cabin and a metal airframe.
The high wing enhances visibility during landing, the fixed landing gear is suitable for rough landing strips.
The removable panels for underfloor access simplify maintenance and operations.
The cabin can accommodate up to nine passengers in a commuter layout.
Cabin options include an air conditioning system.
While designed for single pilot operations, it can be operated by two for initial customer adoption and training.
The clean sheet design allow better accessibility to core systems and flight controls: the flight management system is below the Garmin G1000 NXi glass cockpit, often fitted between the pilot seats as an afterthought in older aircraft.

The primary flight controls are conventional for a low workload.
Seats can be removed for freight or stretchers. Loading is eased by the large rear-facing door.
Additional storage compartments are in the nose and fuselage rear side.
The fuselage is mostly made in light aluminium alloy, including its formed frames, beams, stringers and skin, which are bolted and rivetted together.
The aircraft's cantilever wing is also mostly made of light alloys. beams, main spar caps, wing and tail surface attachments, are formed from billets.
The main landing gear is a pair of two fixed legs with oleo struts attached to the fuselage via a cantilever beam faired by streamlined pods. The steerable nose gear with a single shock-absorbing leg is attached to the forward bulkhead of the fuselage.

The wing has two spars with sheet metal ribs and a fibre-reinforced plastic (GFRP) leading edge.
It has a semi-tapered planform featuring a NACA five digit airfoil selected for low drag and a high maximum lift coefficient. The wing box fuel tanks between the two spars have a capacity of 800 litres (212 US gallons).
Low stall speeds for steep approaches and short landings are enabled by wide slotted flaps, electrically actuated and made of an aluminium alloy. All control surfaces have wide trim tabs, while the rudder has a yaw damper integrated with the automatic flight control system.
The avionics include a three-axis automatic flight control system. An automatic dependent surveillance – broadcast (ADS-B) transponder system is installed as standard and options include an automatic direction finder (ADF) system.

Variants
P2012
Standard civilian version.
P2012 SMP
Special Mission Platform variant.
P-Volt
Proposed electric-powered passenger derivative of P2012, developed by Tecnam with Rolls-Royce plc and Norwegian regional carrier Widerøe to enter service in 2026. It will be equipped with a 1,100 kg (2,425 lb) battery pack and two 320 kW (429 hp) motors, giving a range of 85 nm (157 km), perhaps  by 2030, cruising at 120 kn (222 km/h) with a  top speed, with a  ramp weight.
P2012 STOL
STOL variant using 375 hp (280 kW) Continental GTSIO-520-S engines and longer wingspan.

Specifications

See also

References

External links

Tecnam aircraft
High-wing aircraft
Aircraft first flown in 2016
2010s Italian civil utility aircraft
Twin piston-engined tractor aircraft